Trenewan is a hamlet in Cornwall, England, United Kingdom, about a mile north of Lansallos.

References

Hamlets in Cornwall
Polperro